Victor Matthys (20 March 1914 – 10 November 1947) was a Belgian politician who served as both deputy and acting leader of the Rexist Party. He was later executed for collaboration with Nazi Germany.

An early member of the Rexist movement, Matthys took over the editorship of the party newspaper, Le Pays Réel, in 1936 and in May 1941 was promoted to director of propaganda. He became official leader of Rex that same July after Léon Degrelle left to serve in the Waffen SS. He was nominated for the position as he was a weak character who posed no real threat to Degrelle's position as leader. Matthys was also popular with the Germans as he had a long standing admiration for Adolf Hitler.

As Rexist leader Matthys proved as weak and ineffective as Degrelle had hoped, although he also demonstrated a propensity towards violence to mask his failings. His position eventually came under scrutiny after he ordered the massacre of 20 people in Courcelles as a reprisal against resistance activity. The move was roundly condemned as being too heavy-handed and Matthys gave up the leadership of the Rexists in favour of Louis Collard. He was sentenced to death for collaborationism and executed.

References

External links
Victor Matthys  at "BelgiumWWII" (Cegesoma)

1914 births
1947 deaths
Belgian fascists
Belgian mass murderers
Executed Belgian collaborators with Nazi Germany
Walloon politicians
Belgian propagandists
20th-century Belgian criminals
People executed by Belgium by firing squad
Rexist Party politicians
Executed mass murderers